Zygopetalum (abbreviated Z.) is a genus of the orchid family (Orchidaceae) (subfamily Epidendroideae, tribe Cymbidieae, subtribe Zygopetalinae), consisting of fourteen currently recognized species.

Name 
This orchid's generic name, derived from the Greek word zugón, means "yoke". It refers to the yoke-like growth at the base of the lip.

The genus name has Z. as a unique abbreviation among orchid genera.

Distribution 
They occur in humid forests at low- to mid-elevation regions of South America, with most species in Brazil.

Description 
Most species are epiphytes, but some are terrestrials with glossy, strap-like, plicate leaves, which are apical, oblong or elliptic-lanceolate, acute or acuminate. These orchids have a robust growth form. Their ovoid-conical pseudobulbs are deciduous.

They produce an erect, 60-centimeter-long, few-flowered to several-flowered, racemose inflorescence that grows laterally and is longer than the leaves. Their prominent bracts equal the length of the ovary. They are known for their fragrant, waxy, and long-lived flowers with multiple blooms in shades of green, purple, burgundy, and raspberry with several patterns.

Cultivation 
They are known for their ease of culture and are much in demand as excellent cut flowers.

Species 
Species accepted as of June 2014:

References

External links 

 Orchidroots.org Zygopetalum Species

 
Zygopetalinae genera
Epiphytic orchids